James Brodie Burns Wallace (born September 14, 1999) is a Canadian field hockey player who plays as a midfielder or forward for Dutch club Almere and the Canadian national team.

Club career
Wallace joined Almere in the Dutch Hoofdklasse for the 2020–21 season. He has also played for the UBC Thunderbirds in Canada.

International career
Wallace won a silver medal with the Canada national under-21 team at the 2016 Pan American Junior Championship. He represented Canada at the 2018 World Cup, where he played all four games. In June 2019, he was selected in the Canada squad for the 2019 Pan American Games. They won the silver medal as they lost 5–2 to Argentina in the final.

In June 2021, Wallace was named to Canada's 2020 Summer Olympics team.

References

External links
 

1999 births
Living people
Field hockey players from Vancouver
Canadian male field hockey players
Male field hockey midfielders
Male field hockey forwards
2018 Men's Hockey World Cup players
Field hockey players at the 2019 Pan American Games
Pan American Games silver medalists for Canada
Pan American Games medalists in field hockey
UBC Thunderbirds players
Men's Hoofdklasse Hockey players
Medalists at the 2019 Pan American Games
Field hockey players at the 2020 Summer Olympics
Olympic field hockey players of Canada